The 1996 Pittsburgh Steelers season was the franchise's 64th season as a professional sports franchise and as a member of the National Football League. 

This was Bill Cowher's fifth season as head coach of the Steelers, which resulted in yet another trip to the playoffs for the team, as Pittsburgh won the AFC Central championship for the fourth time under Cowher.

The team's 10–6 record was not enough to earn the Steelers a first-round bye. In their first playoff game, a rematch of the previous year's AFC Championship Game, the Steelers defeated the Colts, However, their season would come to a halt a week later as the Steelers lost to the New England Patriots, 28–3.

Personnel

Staff

Notable additions include Jerome Bettis, Earl Holmes and Carlos Emmons.

Roster

Preseason

Schedule

Regular season

Schedule

Game summaries

Week 1 (Sunday September 1, 1996): at Jacksonville Jaguars

at Alltel Stadium, Jacksonville, Florida

 Game time: 1:00 pm EDT
 Game weather: 
 Game attendance: 70,210
 Referee: Bob McElwee
 TV announcers: (NBC) Marv Albert (play by play), Sam Wyche (color commentator)

Scoring drives:

 Jacksonville – Jackson 38 pass from Brunell (Hollis kick)
 Pittsburgh – FG Johnson 48
 Pittsburgh – FG Johnson 29
 Jacksonville – McCardell 15 pass from Brunell (Hollis kick)
 Pittsburgh – FG Johnson 23
 Jacksonville – FG Hollis 52
 Jacksonville – J. Stewart 1 run (Hollis kick)

Week 2 (Sunday September 8, 1996): vs. Baltimore Ravens

at Three Rivers Stadium, Pittsburgh, Pennsylvania

 Game time: 1:00 pm EDT
 Game weather: 75°F (Partly Sunny)
 Game attendance: 57,241
 Referee: Gerry Austin
 TV announcers: (NBC) Marv Albert (play by play), Sam Wyche (color commentator)

Scoring drives:

 Pittsburgh – Woodson 43 interception return (Johnson kick)
 Baltimore – Testaverde 6 run (Stover kick)
 Pittsburgh – Bettis 1 run (Johnson kick)
 Baltimore – Alexander 17 pass from Testaverde (Stover kick)
 Pittsburgh – C. Johnson 5 pass from Tomczak (Johnson kick)
 Pittsburgh – Hastings 20 pass from Tomczak (Johnson kick)
 Baltimore – FG Stover 29
 Pittsburgh – FG Johnson 35

Week 3 (Monday September 16, 1996): vs. Buffalo Bills

at Three Rivers Stadium, Pittsburgh, Pennsylvania

 Game time: 9:00 pm EDT
 Game weather: 58°F (Cloudy)
 Game attendance: 59,002
 Referee: Larry Nemmers
 TV announcers: (ABC) Al Michaels (play by play), Frank Gifford & Dan Dierdorf (color commentators)

Scoring drives:

 Buffalo – FG Christie 31
 Pittsburgh – Bettis 1 run (Johnson kick)
 Pittsburgh – FG Johnson 30
 Pittsburgh – Bettis 43 run (Johnson kick)
 Pittsburgh – Lake 47 interception return (Johnson kick)
 Buffalo – FG Christie 45

Week 4 (Sunday September 22, 1996): Bye Week

Week 5 (Sunday September 29, 1996): vs. Houston Oilers

at Three Rivers Stadium, Pittsburgh, Pennsylvania

 Game time: 1:00 pm EDT
 Game weather: 59°F (Mostly Sunny)
 Game attendance: 58,608
 Referee: Tom White
 TV announcers: (NBC) Don Criqui (play by play), Beasley Reece (color commentator)

Scoring drives:

 Pittsburgh – Stewart 16 pass from Tomczak (Johnson kick)
 Pittsburgh – FG Johnson 33
 Pittsburgh – C. Johnson 62 pass from Tomczak (Johnson kick)
 Pittsburgh – FG Johnson 36
 Houston – Davis 4 pass from Chandler (Del Greco kick)
 Houston – Lewis 36 interception return (Del Greco kick)
 Pittsburgh – FG N. Johnson 36
 Pittsburgh – Perry 13 interception return (Johnson kick)
 Houston – Safety, Edge ran out of end zone

Week 6 (Monday October 7, 1996): at Kansas City Chiefs

at Arrowhead Stadium, Kansas City, Missouri

 Game time: 9:00 pm EDT
 Game weather: 
 Game attendance: 79,189
 Referee: Howard Roe
 TV announcers: (ABC) Al Michaels (play by play), Frank Gifford & Dan Dierdorf (color commentators)

Scoring drives:

 Kansas City – Allen 6 run (Stoyanovich kick)
 Pittsburgh – FG Johnson 21
 Pittsburgh – FG Johnson 32
 Pittsburgh – Bettis 5 run (Bruener pass from Tomczak)
 Pittsburgh – FG Johnson 43

Week 7 (Sunday October 13, 1996): vs. Cincinnati Bengals

at Three Rivers Stadium, Pittsburgh, Pennsylvania

 Game time: 1:00 pm EDT
 Game weather: 64°F (Partly Sunny)
 Game attendance: 58,875
 Referee: Gary Lane
 TV announcers: (NBC) Charlie Jones (play by play), Randy Cross (color commentator)

Scoring drives:

 Pittsburgh – FG Johnson 33
 Cincinnati – FG Pelfrey 19
 Pittsburgh – Stewart 32 pass from Tomczak (Johnson kick)
 Pittsburgh – FG Johnson 22
 Pittsburgh – Woodson 42 fumble return (Johnson kick)
 Cincinnati – Pickens 3 pass from Blake (Pelfrey kick)

Week 8 (Sunday October 20, 1996): at Houston Oilers

at Astrodome, Houston, Texas

 Game time: 4:00 pm EDT
 Game weather: Dome
 Game attendance: 50,337
 Referee: Red Cashion 
 TV announcers: (NBC) Don Criqui (play by play), Beasley Reece (color commentator)

Scoring drives:

 Houston – FG Del Greco 22
 Pittsburgh – C. Johnson 70 pass from Tomczak (Johnson kick)
 Pittsburgh – FG Johnson 26
 Houston – FG Del Greco 32
 Houston – FG Del Greco 48
 Pittsburgh – FG Johnson 29
 Houston – W. Davis 34 pass from Chandler (Del Greco kick)
 Houston – George 2 run (Del Greco kick)

Week 9 (Sunday October 27, 1996): at Atlanta Falcons

at Georgia Dome, Atlanta, Georgia

 Game time: 1:00 pm EST
 Game weather: Dome
 Game attendance: 58,760
 Referee: Ron Blum
 TV announcers: (NBC) Dan Hicks (play by play), Bob Trumpy (color commentator)

Scoring drives:

 Pittsburgh – FG Johnson 27
 Atlanta – Tobeck 1 pass from Hebert (Andersen kick)
 Atlanta – FG Andersen 41
 Pittsburgh – Hastings 112 pass from Tomczak (Johnson kick)
 Pittsburgh – Bettis 1 run (Johnson kick)
 Atlanta – Emanuel 4 pass from Hebert (Andersen kick)
 Pittsburgh – FG Johnson 20

Week 10 (Sunday November 3, 1996): vs. St. Louis Rams

at Three Rivers Stadium, Pittsburgh, Pennsylvania

 Game time: 1:00 pm EST
 Game weather: 38°F (Partly Sunny)
 Game attendance: 58,148
 Referee: Jerry Markbreit
 TV announcers: (FOX) Joe Buck (play by play), Bill Maas (color commentator)

Scoring drives:

 Pittsburgh – Bettis 3 run (Johnson kick)
 Pittsburgh – Bettis 50 run (Johnson kick)
 Saint louis – FG Lohmiller 25
 Pittsburgh – Stewart 7 run (Johnson kick)
 Saint louis – FG Lohmiller 27
 Pittsburgh- Pegram 91 kickoff return (Johnson kick)
 Pittsburgh – Stewart 2 run (Johnson kick)
 Pittsburgh – Pegram 17 run (Johnson kick)

Week 11 (Sunday November 10, 1996): at Cincinnati Bengals

at Cinergy Field, Cincinnati, Ohio

 Game time: 1:00 pm EST
 Game weather: 
 Game attendance: 57,265
 Referee: Mike Carey
 TV announcers: (NBC) Don Criqui (play by play), Beasley Reece (color commentator)

Scoring drives:

 Cincinnati – FG Pelfrey 32
 Pittsburgh- FG Johnson 46
 Pittsburgh – Bettis 6 run (Johnson kick)
 Cincinnati – Carter 1 run (Pelfrey kick)
 Pittsburgh – Stewart 1 run (Johnson kick)
 Cincinnati – Dunn 90 kickoff return (Pelfrey kick)
 Pittsburgh – Bettis 1 run (Johnson kick)
 Cincinnati – Bieniemy 33 run (Pelfrey kick)
 Cincinnati – Carter 12 pass from Blake (Pelfrey kick)
 Cincinnati – FG Pelfrey 34

Week 12 (Sunday November 17, 1996): vs. Jacksonville Jaguars

at Three Rivers Stadium, Pittsburgh, Pennsylvania

 Game time: 1:00 pm EST
 Game weather: 50°F (Cloudy)
 Game attendance: 58,879
 Referee: Bernie Kukar
 TV announcers: (NBC) Jim Lampley (play by play), Bob Golic (color commentator)

Scoring drives:

 Pittsburgh – Thigpen 12 pass from Tomczak (Johnson kick)
 Pittsburgh – Bettis 3 run (Johnson kick)
 Jacksonville – FG Hollis 40
 Pittsburgh – Lake 85 fumble return (Johnson kick)
 Pittsburgh – Thigpen 28 pass from Tomczak (Johnson kick)

Week 13 (Monday November 25, 1996): at Miami Dolphins

at Pro Player Stadium, Miami, Florida

 Game time: 9:00 pm EST
 Game weather: 
 Game attendance: 73,849
 Referee: Walt Coleman
 TV announcers: (ABC) Al Michaels (play by play), Frank Gifford & Dan Dierdorf (color commentators)

Scoring drives:

 Miami – McDuffie 2 pass from Marino (Nedney kick)
 Pittsburgh – FG Johnson 47
 Miami – Jackson 61 interception return (Nedney kick)
 Pittsburgh- Lester 5 run (Johnson kick)
 Pittsburgh – Stewart 5 run (Johnson kick)
 Miami – FG Nedney 41
 Pittsburgh – Mills 20 pass from Tomczak (Johnson kick)

Week 14 (Sunday December 1, 1996): at Baltimore Ravens

at Memorial Stadium, Baltimore, Maryland

 Game time: 1:00 pm EST
 Game weather: 
 Game attendance: 51,882
 Referee: Red Cashion
 TV announcers: (NBC) Jim Lampley (play by play), Bob Golic (color commentator)

Scoring drives:

 Baltimore – Ogden 1 pass from Testaverde (Stover kick)
 Pittsburgh – Hastings 30 pass from Tomczak (Johnson kick)
 Pittsburgh- FG Johnson 22
 Baltimore – Alexander 24 pass from Testaverd (Stover kick)
 Baltimore – Byner 7 run (Stover kick)
 Baltimore – FG Stover 40
 Pittsburgh – Hastings 5 pass from Tomzak (Johnson kick)
 Baltimore – Green 3 pass from Testaverde (Stover kick)

Week 15 (Sunday December 8, 1996): vs. San Diego Chargers

at Three Rivers Stadium, Pittsburgh, Pennsylvania

 Game time: 1:00 pm EST
 Game weather: 40°F (Partly Sunny)
 Game attendance: 56,368
 Referee: Gerry Austin
 TV announcers: (NBC) Tom Hammond (play by play), Bob Trumpy (color commentator)

Scoring drives:

 Pittsburgh – FG Johnson 49
 Pittsburgh – FG Johnson 39
 Pittsburgh – Hastings 11 pass from Tomzak (Johnson kick)
 San Diego – FG Carney 25
 Pittsburgh – FG Johnson 21

Week 16 (Sunday December 15, 1996): vs. San Francisco 49ers

at Three Rivers Stadium, Pittsburgh, Pennsylvania

 Game time: 1:00 pm EST
 Game weather: 38°F (Partly Sunny)
 Game attendance: 59,823
 Referee: Bob McElwee
 TV announcers: (FOX) Pat Summerall (play by play), John Madden (color commentator)

Scoring drives:

 San Francisco – Rice 4 pass from S. Young (Wilkins kick)
 San Francisco – Safety, B. Young sacked Tomczak in end zone
 San Francisco – Rice 4 pass from S. Young (Wilkins kick)
 San Francisco – Owens 20 pass from S. Young (kick failed)
 Pittsburgh – Bettis 1 run (C. Johnson pass from Tomczak)
 San Francisco – FG Wilkins 22
 Pittsburgh – Stewart 42 pass from Tomczak (Johnson kick)

Week 17 (Sunday December 22, 1996): at Carolina Panthers

at Ericsson Stadium, Charlotte, North Carolina

 Game time: 1:00 pm EST
 Game weather: 
 Game attendance: 72,217
 Referee: Dick Hantak
 TV announcers: (NBC) Don Criqui (play by play), Beasley Reece (color commentator)

Scoring drives:

 Carolina – Walls 9 pass from Collins (Kasay kick)
 Carolina – Safety, Tomczak intentional grounding in end zone
 Pittsburgh – Hastings 6 pass from Tomczak (Johnson kick)
 Pittsburgh – Stewart 80 run (Johnson kick)
 Carolina – FG Kasay 35
 Carolina – FG Kasay 30
 Carolina – FG Kasay 29

Standings

Playoffs

Game summaries

AFC Wild Card Playoff (Sunday December 29, 1996): vs. Indianapolis Colts

at Three Rivers Stadium, Pittsburgh, Pennsylvania

 Game time: 12:30 pm EST
 Game weather: 60°F (Partly Cloudy)
 Game attendance: 58,078
 Referee: Ed Hochuli
 TV announcers: (NBC) Dick Enberg (play by play), Phil Simms & Paul Maguire (color commentators)

Scoring drives:

 Pittsburgh – FG Johnson 29
 Pittsburgh – Stewart 1 run (Johnson kick)
 Pittsburgh – FG Johnson 50
 Indianapolis – Daniel 59 interception return (Blanchard kick)
 Indianapolis – Bailey 9 pass from Harbaugh (Blanchard kick)
 Pittsburgh – Bettis 1 run (Farquhar pass from Stewart)
 Pittsburgh- Bettis 1 run (Johnson kick)
 Pittsburgh – Witman 31 run (Johnson kick)
 Pittsburgh – Stewart 3 run (Johnson kick)

AFC Divisional Playoff (Sunday January 5, 1997): at New England Patriots

at Foxboro Stadium, Foxborough, Massachusetts

 Game time: 12:30 pm EST
 Game weather: 40°F (Fog)
 Game attendance: 60,188
 Referee: Bernie Kukar
 TV announcers: (NBC) Marv Albert (play by play), Sam Wyche & Randy Cross (color commentators)

Scoring drives:

 New England – Martin 2 run (Vinatieri kick)
 New England – Byars 34 pass from Bledsoe (Vinatieri kick)
 New England – Martin 78 run (Vinatieri kick)
 Pittsburgh – FG Johnson 29
 New England – Martin 23 run (Vinatieri kick)

Honors and awards

Pro Bowl Representatives

 No. 26 Rod Woodson-Cornerback
 No. 36 Jerome Bettis-Running Back
 No. 37 Carnell Lake-Safety
 No. 63 Dermontti Dawson-Center
 No. 94 Chad Brown-Outside Linebacker
 No. 99 Levon Kirkland-Inside Linebacker

References

External links
 1996 Pittsburgh Steelers season at Pro Football Reference 
 1996 Pittsburgh Steelers season statistics at jt-sw.com 

Pittsburgh Steelers seasons
Pittsburgh Steelers
AFC Central championship seasons
Pitts